The chapters of The Law of Ueki are written and illustrated by Tsubasa Fukuchi and serialized in Shogakukan shōnen magazine Weekly Shōnen Sunday. The serial chapters are collected in 16 tankōbon with the first one released on December 18, 2001 and the last one on January 14, 2005. The series was followed by a sequel The Law of Ueki Plus which also ran on Shōnen Sunday and its serial chapters collected into 5 tankōbon published between August 8, 2005 and September 18, 2007.

In North American only the first series has been published by Viz Media with the 16 volumes released between August 8, 2006 and February 10, 2009.

Volume list

The Law of Ueki

The Law of Ueki Plus

References

External links

Lists of manga volumes and chapters